Winn Springs is an unincorporated community in Hardin County, Tennessee. Winn Springs is located on the west bank of the Tennessee River just north of the Mississippi and Alabama borders. The community is east of Red Sulphur Springs.

References

Unincorporated communities in Hardin County, Tennessee
Unincorporated communities in Tennessee